Michał Rawita-Witanowski (September 13, 1858—February 25, 1943) was a Polish historian and pharmacist.

Michał Rawita-Witanowski was born in Częstochowa, graduating from middle school in Kielce. From 1880 to 1884 he studied pharmacy at the University of Warsaw. From 1890 to 1907 he owned a pharmacy in Kłodawa. In 1907 he moved to Piotrków Trybunalski. He was the founder of several local cultural organisations and wrote numerous publications on the history, archaeology, ethnography and geography of Poland. Streets bearing his name can be found in Koło and Kłodawa.

1858 births
1943 deaths
People from Częstochowa
People from Warsaw Governorate
Polish pharmacists
Polish male non-fiction writers
20th-century Polish historians
19th-century Polish historians